Frederick William Cadogan DL, JP (16 December 1821  – 30 November 1904), styled The Honourable from 1831, was a British barrister and Liberal politician.

He was the fourth son of George Cadogan, 3rd Earl Cadogan and his wife Honoria Louisa Blake, daughter of Joseph Blake and sister of Joseph Blake, 1st Baron Wallscourt. Cadogan was educated at Westminster School and then at Oriel College, Oxford. He was called to the bar by the Inner Temple in 1847 and practised in the Northern Circuit.

Having unsuccessfully stood for Bridgnorth in 1852 and for Stafford five years later, Cadogan entered the British House of Commons in 1868, sitting as Member of Parliament (MP) for Cricklade until 1874. He was a Deputy Lieutenant for Middlesex and represented the same county as well as Westminster as a Justice of the Peace.

On 29 November 1851, Cadogan married Lady Adelaide Paget, eight daughter of Henry Paget, 1st Marquess of Anglesey. They had three daughters and a son.

References

External links

1821 births
1904 deaths
English justices of the peace
Alumni of Oriel College, Oxford
Deputy Lieutenants of Middlesex
Liberal Party (UK) MPs for English constituencies
Members of the Inner Temple
People educated at Westminster School, London
UK MPs 1868–1874
Younger sons of earls
Frederick William
Members of the Parliament of the United Kingdom for Cricklade